Laura Checkoway is an American journalist and filmmaker, known for her documentary Edith+Eddie for which she received an Academy Award for Best Documentary Short Subject nomination at the 90th Academy Awards. The film also received an Emmy nomination and won numerous awards including the IDA Documentary Awards Best Short. In The New Yorker, critic Richard Brody wrote: “One of the most impressive aspects of Checkoway’s film is that, with a simple and straightforward approach, she brings the overwhelming force of abstract institutions seemingly onto the screen.” Academy Award winning filmmaker Julia Reichert called Edith+Eddie "One of the most beautiful and quietly furious films I've ever seen." Checkoway's documentary The Cave of Adullam is executive produced by Laurence Fishburne and premiered at Tribeca Film Festival in 2022, winning Best Documentary Feature, Best Editing, and the Audience Award. She received NYWIFT’s Excellence in Documentary Filmmaking Award in 2022.

With a background in journalism, Checkoway was a writer for numerous publications including Rolling Stone.

Checkoway wrote the 05 February 2008 Village Voice cover story entitled "Prodigy's 25th Hour." In 2011, Simon & Schuster published My Infamous Life: The Autobiography of Mobb Deep’s Prodigy, a memoir co-authored by Checkoway and Prodigy. This work has been described in the Ringer as being "one of the best music autobiographies ever."

Filmography
2022: The Cave of Adullam (Documentary feature) Executive producer Laurence Fishburne. 
2017: Edith+Eddie (Documentary short) Executive producers Steve James and Cher.   
2014: Lucky (Documentary feature) Executive producer Steve James.

References

External links
  
 

Living people
American producers
American directors
American photographers
Year of birth missing (living people)